The 2012 Michigan Wolverines football team, sometimes known as Team 133 in reference to the 133-year tradition of the Michigan football program, represented the University of Michigan in the sport of college football during the 2012 NCAA Division I FBS football season.

Under second-year head coach Brady Hoke, Michigan played in the Legends Division of the Big Ten Conference and played its home games at Michigan Stadium in Ann Arbor, Michigan. Highlights of Michigan's season included Michigan becoming the first college football program to win 900 games in NCAA history with its victory over Michigan State and snapping a four-game losing streak to Michigan State as well, as well as a come-from-behind victory against Northwestern.

Taylor Lewan was named Big Ten Offensive Lineman of the Year and All-American, while Will Hagerup was named the Big Ten Punter of the Year. Patrick Omameh also earned first team All-Big Ten recognition. Craig Roh, co-captain Jordan Kovacs and Jake Ryan earned second team recognition. Although they split the quarterbacking duties, both Devin Gardner and co-captain Denard Robinson earned multiple Big Ten Player of the Week awards with Robinson rewriting record books along the way. Following the season, Kovacs was voted team MVP.

Preseason
The 2011 Michigan Wolverines football team compiled an 11–2 record under first-year head coach Brady Hoke and defeated Virginia Tech in the 2012 Sugar Bowl, 23–20 in overtime. In recognition of the team's drastic improvement from the 2010 season, Brady Hoke won Big Ten Coach of the Year awards from both the coaches and media.

Michigan returned 13 out of 22 starters — six on offense and seven on defense. Michigan had also expected to see the return of wide receiver Darryl Stonum, who was redshirted the previous season for disciplinary reason, but Stonum was dismissed from the team on January 17, 2012, for a violation of team rules. He transferred to Baylor. Michigan was forced to replace captains center David Molk, defensive tackle Mike Martin, and tight end Kevin Koger, as well as starters defensive end Ryan Van Bergen, defensive tackle Will Heininger, safety Troy Woolfolk, offensive tackle Mark Huyge, long snapper Tom Pomarico and wide receiver Junior Hemingway, as well as the 2011 team's leading kickoff returner Martavious Odoms.

Safety Josh Furman was arrested February 11, 2012 and faced three misdemeanor charges (illegal entry, assault and battery, and domestic violence) in court. He declined the offer of a plea agreement of domestic violence. He was found not guilty of all three charges on April 26, 2012. On April 30 he was reinstated to the team. In late May 2012, defensive lineman Will Campbell was charged with felony malicious-destruction-of-property arising out of an incident on April 7 in which the six foot, five inch, 322-pound athlete "slid across the hood" of a Lincoln Towncar, causing damage to the hood.  On June 14, Campbell reached a plea deal in which the felony charge was waived in exchange for a guilty plea to a misdemeanor charge and an agreement to pay $2,100 in restitution to the vehicle's owner. On July 23, Toussaint was suspended from the team following a July 21 arrest for driving under the influence.

Eight Michigan players were named to pre-season award watch lists: (1) Denard Robinson for the Walter Camp Award (best college), the Maxwell Award (best offensive player), the Davey O'Brien Award (best quarterback), the Manning Award (best quarterback as judged by the Sugar Bowl committee), as well as a Big Ten player to watch, (2) Fitzgerald Toussaint for the Maxwell Award and the Doak Walker Award (best running back), (3) Taylor Lewan for the Outland Trophy (best lineman), the Lombardi Award (best lineman or linebacker), as well as a Big Ten player to watch, (4) Jordan Kovacs for the Bronko Nagurski Trophy (best defensive player), (5) Roy Roundtree for the Biletnikoff Award (best receiver), (6) Brendan Gibbons for the Lou Groza Award (best placekicker), (7) Kenny Demens for the Lombardi Award, and (8) Craig Roh for the Ted Hendricks Award (best defensive end). In addition, Patrick Omameh was nominated for the 2012 Allstate AFCA Good Works Team, which is awarded for community service. On August 26, the team voted Denard Robinson and Jordan Kovacs as its captains for the season.

Recruiting

Position key

Recruits
Michigan's recruiting class was ranked No. 4 by Scout and No. 7 by both Rivals and ESPN. The program received 25 letters of intent on National Signing Day, February 1, 2012.

Rankings
Entering the season, Michigan was ranked No. 8 in both the AP Poll and the Coaches' Poll. Following its opening week loss to Alabama, Michigan dropped to No. 19 in both polls, but rose to No. 18 in the Coaches' Poll and No. 17 in the AP Poll following its victory against Air Force. After its victory against Massachusetts, Michigan rose to No. 17 in the Coaches' Poll, but fell to No. 18 in the AP Poll. Michigan dropped out of the rankings following its loss to Notre Dame, and then stayed unranked following the bye week. Michigan re-entered the AP Poll at No. 25 following its win against Purdue, but remained unranked in the Coaches' Poll. Following its victory over Illinois, Michigan rose to No. 23 in the AP Poll and re-entered the Coaches' Poll at No. 25. Michigan rose to No. 20 in both polls following its victory over Michigan State and entered the BCS rankings at No. 22. Michigan fell out of the rankings after its loss to Nebraska, and remained unranked following its victory over Minnesota. Michigan re-entered the rankings after its overtime win against Northwestern at No. 23 in both the AP Poll and the Coaches' Poll and No. 21 in the BCS poll. After its victory over Iowa, Michigan moved up to No. 20 in both the AP and Coaches' Polls and No. 19 in the BCS Poll. Michigan fell to No. 21 in the AP Poll and No. 24 in the Coaches' Poll, but remained at No. 19 in the BCS Poll after its loss to Ohio State. Michigan rose to No. 19 in the AP Poll and No. 22 in the Coaches' Poll after a bye week. After its loss to South Carolina in the Outback Bowl, Michigan finished the season ranked No. 24 in the AP Poll and unranked in the Coaches' Poll.

*Source: ESPN.com: 2012 NCAA Football Rankings

Schedule

Radio
Radio coverage for all games will be broadcast statewide on The Michigan Wolverines Football Network and on Sirius XM Satellite Radio. The radio announcers are Frank Beckmann with play-by-play, Jim Brandstatter with color commentary, and Doug Karsch with sideline reports.

Game summaries

vs. Alabama

Sources:
 
    
    
    
    
    
    
    
    

To open the season, Michigan traveled to Arlington, Texas to face the defending BCS Champion, the Alabama Crimson Tide, in the Cowboys Classic. This game was the first between the two teams since the 2000 Orange Bowl, which saw Michigan beat Alabama in overtime 35–34 after Alabama missed the tying extra point.

Alabama dominated the Wolverines in the first game of the season, winning 41–14. Alabama opened the scoring and scored 21 points in the first quarter, with Michael Williams catching a two-yard touchdown pass from A. J. McCarron, DeAndrew White catching a 51-yard touchdown pass from McCarron, and Eddie Lacy rushing nine yards for a score. Alabama added ten points in the second quarter as a result of a Jeremy Shelley 22-yard field goal and a C. J. Mosley 16-yard interception return for a touchdown. Michigan scored its first points at the end of the first half on a Denard Robinson six-yard touchdown run, making the halftime score 31–7. In the third quarter, Cade Foster kicked a 51-yard field goal for Alabama, while Michigan responded via a 44-yard touchdown pass from Robinson to Devin Gardner. Those were Michigan's final points of the game. Alabama scored its final points of the game in the fourth quarter as a result of a T. J. Yeldon one-yard run.

The game was Michigan's first season opener at a neutral venue. The loss was Michigan's first in September since September 13, 2008, against Notre Dame. Michigan's record against Alabama fell to 2–2. Jeremy Gallon's 71-yard reception in the second quarter set a record for the longest play in Cowboys Classic history, while Will Hagerup's 61-yard punt also set the record for longest punt in Cowboys Classic history. Thomas Gordon led Michigan's defense with nine tackles and forced one fumble.

vs. Air Force

Sources:

    
    
    
    
    
    
    
    

Following its trip to Arlington, Michigan hosted the Air Force Falcons in its home opener. This was the first meeting between the teams since Michigan's season opener in 1964, which the Wolverines won 24–7. Pre-game festivities featured a trio of flyovers: a flight by three University of Michigan Survival Flight helicopters, a flight by the bald eagle Challenger, and a B-2 stealth bomber. Prior to the game, Michigan reactivated Bennie Oosterbaan's number (#47) and honored him as a Michigan Football Legend. Linebacker Jake Ryan was given Oosterbaan's number following the conclusion of the ceremony.

The Wolverines won the game, 31–25. Following a missed field goal on Air Force's opening drive, Denard Robinson ran 79 yards for a touchdown. Air Force responded with a 22-yard field goal from Parker Herrington. In the second quarter, Michigan expanded its lead via a 30-yard Robinson to Devin Funchess touchdown pass. Air Force responded with a five-yard touchdown run from Cody Getz, ending the half trailing 14–10. In the third quarter, Robinson expand Michigan's lead to 11 with a 58-yard touchdown run. Air Force responded with a Getz one-yard run, but Michigan once again increased its lead to 11 points with a Robinson to Devin Gardner seven-yard touchdown pass. In the fourth quarter, Air Force responded with a Getz eight-yard run and converted the two-point conversion attempt on a Getz to Marcus Hendricks pass. Michigan ended the scoring with a Brendan Gibbons 31-yard field goal. Air Force had the ball late in the fourth quarter when linebacker Jake Ryan batted down a pass on fourth down with 1:28 left in the game to secure the victory for Michigan.

Denard Robinson became the first Division-I FBS player to have three career games with at least 200 yards passing and 200 yards rushing. Robinson ran for 218 yards and two touchdowns, and passed for 208 yards and two touchdowns, his eight career game with at least four touchdowns. He was also the first Michigan player to have two touchdown runs of 50 or more yards since Tyrone Wheatley in the 1993 Rose Bowl against Washington. Freshman tight end Devin Funchess became the first Michigan tight end to have at least 100 receiving yards since 1997, when Jerame Tuman had 126 receiving yards against Colorado. Jake Ryan led the Wolverines' defense with 11 tackles, while Joe Boldon posted a career best 10 tackles. The effort moved Robinson into eighth place on the NCAA all-time career quarterback rushing yards list and seventh on the Michigan all-time rushing list. Denard Robinson's September 8, performance earned him his eighth Big Ten Offensive Player of the week recognition as well as College Football Performance Award National Player of the Week and National Quarterback of the Week honors. The same week Devin Funchess earned Freshman of the week honors. By earning his eighth Big Ten Offensive Player of the week recognition, he tied Drew Brees for second on the all-time career list.

vs. Massachusetts

Sources:

    
    
    
    
    
    
    
    
    
    
    

Following its game against Air Force, Michigan hosted the Massachusetts (UMass) Minutemen for the first time since 2010. In the previous meeting, Michigan won 42–37. Prior to the game, Michigan reactivated Ron Kramer's number (#87) and honored him as a Michigan Football Legend. It was given to tight end Brandon Moore.

Michigan dominated the game throughout the game, winning 63–13. Michigan scored twice in the first quarter via a 26-yard touchdown pass from Denard Robinson to Devin Funchess and an 11-yard run from Fitzgerald Toussaint. The teams traded scores in the second quarter. Brendon Levengood kicked a 25-yard field goal for UMass's first points of the game, but Michigan responded with a five-yard touchdown run from Vincent Smith. UMass responded with a Christian Birt 32-yard interception return for a touchdown, but Michigan countered with 42-yard touchdown pass from Robinson to Devin Gardner, and then expanded its lead via a 36-yard run from Robinson. UMass responded with a 32-yard field goal from Levengood (its final points of the game), but Michigan closed the scoring in the first half with a Taylor Lewan fumble recovery in the endzone for a touchdown. Michigan entered halftime with a 42–13 lead. In the second half, Michigan added two scores in the third quarter via an 18-yard Robinson to Roy Roundtree pass and a Vincent Smith nine-yard run, and ended the scoring in the fourth quarter on a one-yard run from Justice Hayes.

Eight different players scored touchdowns for Michigan. Michigan's 63 points were the most points scored since 2010, when the Wolverines defeated Illinois 67–65 in triple overtime. Its 42 first-half points were the most first-half points scored since 2009, when Michigan played Delaware State. Jake Ryan recorded another tackle for a loss, making this game the ninth straight game (dating back to the previous season) in which he has recorded at least one tackle for a loss. Lewan's touchdown was his first career collegiate touchdown. Denard Robinson moved into second place on the list of Michigan's all-time career yardage leaders after the game.

at Notre Dame

Sources:

    
    
    
    

Following its meeting with UMass, Michigan traveled to South Bend to face the Notre Dame Fighting Irish. In the previous meeting—the first ever night game at Michigan Stadium—Michigan came back from a 17-point deficit to lead Notre Dame 28–24 with 1:12 remaining, and after surrendering a touchdown with 30 seconds remaining, beat Notre Dame 35–31 on a Denard Robinson to Roy Roundtree touchdown pass with two seconds remaining in the game.

Notre Dame won a turnover filled game, 13–6. After a scoreless first quarter, Notre Dame opened the scoring with a 33-yard field goal from Kyle Brindza and added to its lead before halftime via a two-yard touchdown run from Tommy Rees. Notre Dame led 10–0 at halftime. After a scoreless third quarter, Michigan scored its first points of the game via a 33-yard field goal from Brendan Gibbons. Notre Dame responded with a 39-yard field goal from Kyle Brindza, but Michigan added another field goal—a 31-yard kick from Gibbons—to cut the lead to seven. Notre Dame was able to run out the clock on the ensuing drive, ending the game and ending a three-game losing streak to Michigan.

Denard Robinson moved into first place on Michigan's career total yardage list, passing Chad Henne, but accounted for five of Michigan's six turnovers with four interceptions and a fumble. His 1,197 yards of offense against Notre Dame makes him the opponent to have gained the most yards against Notre Dame in history. Kenny Demens and Jordan Kovacs led Michigan's defense with seven tackles each.

at Purdue

Sources:

    
    
    
    
    
    
    
    
    
    

After its trip to South Bend, and its bye week, Michigan traveled to West Lafayette, Indiana to face the Purdue Boilermakers. In the previous meeting, Michigan dominated Purdue and won by a score of 36–14.

Michigan again dominated the game, winning 44–13. Michigan scored the only points of the first quarter on a one-yard touchdown run from Fitzgerald Toussaint. Michigan then extended its lead in the second quarter with another one-yard touchdown run from Toussaint and then via 63-yard interception return from Ramon Taylor. Purdue responded with a 40-yard field goal from Paul Griggs, but Michigan extended its lead on a 23-yard touchdown pass from Denard Robinson to Devin Gardner. Purdue ended the first half scoring with its only touchdown of the game, a four-yard pass from Caleb TerBush to O.J. Ross. The only points in the third quarter came from Michigan via a 37-yard field goal from Gibbons. In the fourth quarter, Griggs kicked a 37-yard field goal for Purdue, but Michigan responded with two field goals of its own from Gibbons: one from 42 yards and one from 27 yards. Michigan's final points came from on a Thomas Rawls seven-yard touchdown run.

Denard Robinson became the Big Ten's all-time leading rusher as a quarterback with his 235-yard performance, passing Antwaan Randle El in the process. The game was also Robinson's fifth game of more than 200 yards rushing, which tied Mike Hart as the leader for most 200 yard games. Michigan's opening drive lasted 17 plays and 8:48 in time of possession. Michigan has now won 30 of its last 31 Big Ten openers, including its last seven. Robinson was named the Maxwell Award's player of the week and Manning Award Player of the Week (with a record setting vote total) for his efforts during the game. Robinson also earned a ninth career Big Ten Offensive Player of the Week award, which tied Ron Dayne's career record.

vs. Illinois

Sources:

    
    
    
    
    
    

Following its trip to West Lafayette, Michigan returned home for its homecoming game against the Illinois Fighting Illini. In the previous meeting, Michigan won by a score of 31–14. Prior to the game, Michigan reactivated Gerald Ford's number (#48) and honored him as a Michigan Football Legend. Linebacker Desmond Morgan was given the number following its reactivation.

Michigan shut out Illinois, winning 45–0. In the first quarter, Jeremy Gallon caught a 71-yard touchdown pass from Denard Robinson to open the scoring for Michigan. Brendan Gibbons followed that with an 18-yard field goal. The only scoring in the second quarter came on a six-yard run from Robinson. In the third quarter, Robinson scored on a 49-yard run and then threw an eight-yard touchdown pass to Devin Funchess. Fitzgerald Toussaint ended the third quarter scoring with a two-yard run. Michigan's final points came in the fourth quarter on a 65-yard run from Thomas Rawls.

The shutout was Michigan's first since its 58–0 victory against Minnesota in 2011. Denard Robinson became the eighth player in NCAA history to rush for 40 touchdowns and pass for 40 touchdowns in his career. Nine different players recorded receptions during the game, while Jake Ryan recorded 11 tackles, including three and a half tackles for a loss. Russell Bellomy and Jack Kennedy both completed their first career collegiate passes during the fourth quarter. Ryan was named the Big Ten's defensive player of the week for his efforts.

vs. Michigan State

Sources:

    
    
    
    
    

After homecoming against Illinois, Michigan hosted its in-state rival, the Michigan State Spartans, for the Paul Bunyan Trophy. Michigan State won the previous game by a score of 28–14. Michigan honored Willis Ward before the game.

Michigan won a low-scoring defensive battle, 12–10. Following a scoreless first quarter, Michigan opened the scoring in the second quarter with a 24-yard field goal from Brendan Gibbons, and added to its lead before halftime with a 48-yard field goal from Matt Wile. Michigan State scored its first points of the game and took the lead in the third quarter on a two-yard touchdown pass from Andrew Maxwell to Paul Lang. Michigan answered in the fourth quarter and regained the lead via a 21-yard field goal from Gibbons, but Michigan State answered with a 19-yard field goal from Dan Conroy. Michigan won the game with a last minute 38-yard field goal from Gibbons.

With the victory, Michigan became the first team in college football to reach 900 wins in program history. Michigan improved its record to 68–32–5 against Michigan State and recorded its first victory against the Spartans since 2007. This was Michigan's first victory without scoring a touchdown since a 5–0 win against Purdue in 1995. Matt Wile's 48-yard field goal was his first career field goal and Michigan's longest since 2009, when Jason Olesnavege kicked a 51-yard field goal against Purdue. Jordan Kovacs had an interception and posted his 300th career tackle during the game. Desmond Morgan led the Wolverines with 11 tackles. Gibbons was named the Big Ten's Special Teams Player of the Week in recognition of his efforts.

at Nebraska

Sources:

    
    
    
    
    
    
    

Following its clash with Michigan State, Michigan traveled to Lincoln for the first time since 1911 to face the Nebraska Cornhuskers. Michigan dominated the previous meeting, winning 45–17.

Following an injury to Denard Robinson in the first half, Nebraska controlled the game and won 23–9. After a scoreless first quarter, Nebraska opened the scoring in the second quarter with a 37-yard touchdown pass from Taylor Martinez to Kenny Bell. Michigan responded with two Brendan Gibbons field goals before halftime, one from 52 yards and one from 24 yards. In the third quarter, Nebraska added three field goals from Brett Maher, from 19, 51, and 31 yards respectively. Michigan answered with a 38-yard field goal from Brendan Gibbons. Nebraska ended the scoring in the fourth quarter on a 12-yard touchdown run from Ameer Abdullah.

The attendance of 86,160 was the second largest in Memorial Stadium history. Gibbons' 52-yard field goal was a career long and was the longest by a Michigan kicker since 2001, when Hayden Epstein kicked a 57-yard field goal against Michigan State. Craig Roh posted two tackles-for-a-loss, including one sack. Kenny Demens led the team with ten tackles.

at Minnesota

Sources:

    
    
    
    
    
    
    

After its trip to Lincoln, Michigan traveled to Minneapolis to meet the Minnesota Golden Gophers in the annual battle for the Little Brown Jug. In the previous meeting, Michigan posted its first shutout since 2007, beating the Golden Gophers 58–0.  The 2012 game was Michigan's first at TCF Bank Stadium, which opened in 2009.

With Devin Gardner starting his first game as Michigan's quarterback, the Wolverines dominated the Golden Gophers and won the game, 35–13. Following a scoreless first quarter, Minnesota opened the scoring with a ten-yard touchdown pass from Philip Nelson to John Rabe. Michigan responded with a 47-yard touchdown pass from Gardner to Drew Dileo. Michigan added to its lead with a two-yard touchdown run from Thomas Rawls shortly before halftime. Michigan scored only points of the third quarter on a ten-yard touchdown pass from Gardner to Jeremy Gallon. Minnesota answered with a 26-yard field goal from Jordan Wettstein, but Michigan expanded its lead with a two-yard touchdown run from Devin Gardner. Minnesota responded with a 19-yard field goal from Wettstein. Michigan ended the scoring with a 41-yard touchdown run from Fitzgerald Toussaint.

Gardner made his first career start at quarterback in place of Denard Robinson, who sustained an injury to his ulnar nerve in the previous week's game against Nebraska.  Michigan sustained two drives of 90 or more yards for only the second time in program history; it was the first time this had occurred on consecutive drives. This game was the sixth time in the season in which Michigan held an opponent to 13 points or less.  Kenny Demens led the team with ten tackles and a tackle for a loss. Jake Ryan had nine tackles, with three of those for a loss.  The game was Michigan's first in Minnesota that had been played outdoors in 41 years.

vs. Northwestern

Sources:

    
    
    
    
    
    
    
    
    
    

Following its game against Minnesota, Michigan returned to Ann Arbor to face the Northwestern Wildcats. Michigan rallied to win the previous meeting 42–24 after being down 24–14 at halftime. Prior to the game, Michigan reactivated the previously retired jersey (#11) that had been worn by the three Wistert brothers (Francis, Alvin and Albert) as a Michigan Football Legends jersey. Jordan Kovacs was given the number to wear for the remainder of his career.

Michigan won the game 38–31 in overtime. Northwestern opened the scoring in the first quarter on a three-yard touchdown run by Venric Mark, but Michigan tied the score on an eight-yard touchdown run from Devin Gardner. In the second quarter, Michigan took a 14–7 lead on a one-yard touchdown run from Thomas Rawls, but Northwestern tied the score on a 19-yard touchdown pass from Trevor Siemian to Cameron Dickerson. Northwestern regained the lead in the third quarter on a 23-yard pass from Kain Colter to Dan Vitale, and then expanded its lead on a 34-yard field goal from Jeff Budzien. Michigan responded with a 28-yard touchdown pass from Gardner to Fitzgerald Toussaint and then regained the lead in the fourth quarter on an eight-yard touchdown pass from Gardner to Devin Funchess. Northwestern regained the lead on a 15-yard touchdown pass from Siemian to Tony Jones.  With 18 second remaining, Gardner completed a 53-yard pass to Roy Roundtree at the Northwestern eight-yard line.  Brendan Gibbons tied the game on a 26-yard field goal with two seconds remaining.  Michigan scored the only points of the overtime period on a one-yard touchdown run by Gardner.

Michigan improved its record to 8–1 overall in overtime games and 4–0 in home overtime games. It was Michigan's first overtime game since the 2012 Sugar Bowl and the first home overtime game since the game against Illinois in 2010. Northwestern's touchdown on its opening drive was the first opening drive touchdown Michigan allowed during the 2012 season. Gardner completed 16 of 29 passes for two touchdowns and a career-high 286 yards.  Roundtree caught five passes for 139 receiving yards, and Jeremy Gallon caught seven passes for 94 yards. Fitzgerald Toussaint contributed 93 rushing yards and 28 receiving yards.  Thomas Gordon led the defense with 11 tackles, while Craig Roh added one sack for the Wolverines. Kenny Demens had nine tackles for Michigan. Gardner was named the Big Ten's Co-Offensive Player of the Week for his efforts. Gardner was also named the Manning Award Player of the Week.

vs. Iowa

Sources:

    
    
    
    
    
    
    
    

After its game against Northwestern, Michigan completed the home portion of its schedule against the Iowa Hawkeyes. Iowa won the previous meeting, 24–16, and had won three straight games against Michigan. Michigan had last beaten Iowa in the 2006 season. Michigan honored former coach Gary Moeller during the game.

Michigan won the game, 42–17. On Michigan's opening drive, running back Fitzgerald Toussaint sustained a leg injury which required surgery later in the day. The Wolverines went on to score a touchdown on the opening drive on a one-yard run from Devin Gardner.  Iowa tied the score on the following drive on a 16-yard touchdown pass from James Vandenburg to Coble Krieger. Michigan scored three touchdowns in the second quarter, starting with a 37-yard touchdown pass from Gardner to Roy Roundtree followed by a one-yard run from Gardner and an 18-yard pass from Gardner to Vincent Smith. Iowa was limited to a field goal in the second quarter, and Michigan led 28–10 at halftime. Michigan added two touchdowns in the third quarter on a three-yard touchdown run from Gardner and a 29-yard touchdown pass from Gardner to Devin Funchess. Iowa ended the scoring with a 13-yard touchdown run from Mark Weisman.

Devin Gardner accounted for all six of Michigan's touchdowns, three rushing and three passing, and became the first Michigan player to account for six touchdowns in a game since Steve Smith accomplished the feat against Minnesota in 1983. Gardner completed 18 of 23 passes for 314 yards and three touchdowns. He also rushed for 37 yards and scored three touchdowns. His total of 314 passing yards ranks 16th all-time in Michigan's record book for a single game. Jeremy Gallon led the receivers with  five passes for 133 yards. On defense, Joe Bolden recorded two tackles-for-loss, while Kenny Demens also had a tackle-for-loss. Denard Robinson returned after missing the two previous games with an injury to the ulnar nerve in his right elbow, started at running back, and also played quarterback and wide receiver, recording two catches for 24 yards and rushing 13 times for 98 yards. Gardner was named the Big Ten's Co-Offensive Player of the Week for his efforts, while James Ross was named the Big Ten's Co-Freshman of the Week for his performance.  Gardner was also named the Manning Award Player of the Week.

at Ohio State

Sources:

    
    
    
    
    
    
    
    

Following its home finale against Iowa, Michigan traveled to Columbus to face arch-rival Ohio State in the 109th meeting of "The Game". Michigan snapped its seven-game losing streak to the Buckeyes the previous year, winning 40–34.

Michigan lost 26–21 after leading 21–20 at halftime, ensuring they would not have a share of the Legends Division title. Ohio State opened the scoring on its opening drive with a three-yard touchdown run from Carlos Hyde. Michigan responded later in the first quarter with a 75-yard touchdown pass from Devin Gardner to Roy Roundtree. Ohio State responded with a 37-yard field goal from Drew Basil and led 10–7 after one quarter. Michigan took the lead in the second quarter with a two-yard run from Devin Gardner, but Ohio State regained the lead with 1:30 left in the half via a 14-yard pass from Braxton Miller to Corey Brown. Michigan regained the lead with :47 seconds left on a Denard Robinson 67-yard touchdown run. Ohio State ended the half with a 52-yard field goal from Basil, which cut Michigan's lead to 21–20 halftime. Ohio State scored the only points of the second half on two Basil field goals: a 28-yard field goal in the third quarter and a 25-yard field goal in the fourth quarter.

With his 67-yard touchdown run, Denard Robinson became Michigan's all-time touchdown leader with 91 total touchdowns, passing Chad Henne. He also passed Brad Smith for second place on the all-time quarterback rush list, trailing only Pat White. Roy Roundtree recorded his third straight game with at least 80 receiving yards. Jake Ryan forced two fumbles, setting a new Michigan single season record with five forced fumbles. Desmond Morgan led the defense with 11 tackles, while Will Campbell recorded ten tackles. Craig Roh made his 50th straight start, tying Jon Jansen for the school record of most career starts.

vs. South Carolina

Sources:

    
    
    
    
    
    
    
    
    
    

On December 2, Michigan was selected to play in the Outback Bowl in Tampa, Florida against the South Carolina Gamecocks. This was the first meeting between the two schools since Michigan traveled to South Carolina in 1985, which Michigan won 34–3, and Michigan's first trip to the Outback Bowl since 2003, when Michigan defeated Florida 38–30. Junior starting fullback Stephen Hopkins left the team prior to the bowl game after not regaining his starting role following recovery from a midseason injury, while J.T. Floyd, Brandin Hawthorne, and Will Hagerup were suspended for the game for a violation of team rules.

Michigan lost 33–28 on a last minute touchdown from Dylan Thompson to Bruce Ellington. South Carolina opened the scoring in the first quarter via a 56-yard touchdown pass from Connor Shaw to Damiere Byrd. Michigan responded with a 39-yard field goal from Brendan Gibbons, but South Carolina extended its lead to 11 points from an Ace Sanders 63-yard punt return for a touchdown. Michigan answered with a 5-yard touchdown pass from Devin Gardner to Drew Dileo in the second quarter, making the score 14–10, but South Carolina responded with a 4-yard pass from Thompson to Sanders. Gibbons added a 40-yard field goal for Michigan before halftime, making the score 21–13 at halftime. Michigan scored the first points of the second half in the third quarter on a 52-yard field goal from Matt Wile and then added another touchdown via a 10-yard pass from Gardner to Jeremy Gallon, making the score 22–21 after a failed two-point conversion attempt. South Carolina responded with a 31-yard touchdown pass from Shaw to Sanders, but its two-point conversion attempt also failed. Michigan regained the lead 28–27 via a 15-yard touchdown pass from Gardner to Gallon, but once again failed on its two-point conversion attempt. South Carolina ended the scoring with 11 seconds left on a 32-yard touchdown pass from Thompson to Ellington, and also saw its two-point conversion attempt fail.

Michigan's bowl record fell to 20–22 and 3–2 in the Outback Bowl. Denard Robinson broke the all-time record for quarterback rushing yards with his 100-yard performance, eclipsing Pat White's record of 4,480 yards, and setting the new record at 4,495 yards. Robinson also finished second in rushing in school history with only Mike Hart's 5,040 yards surpassing Robinson's rushing total of 4,495 yards. Gallon's nine receptions and 145 receiving yards were both career highs. Jake Ryan recorded one and a half tackles for a loss, including half of a sack. Wile's 52-yard field goal was a career long and set a record for the longest field goal in the Outback Bowl, surpassing Philip Doyle's record of 51 yards for Alabama in 1988.

Awards and honors
Taylor Lewan was named to Sports Illustrated's midseason All-American team. On September 18, Patrick Omameh was named to the Allstate American Football Coaches Association (AFCA) Good Works Team. On October 22, Denard Robinson was named a Davey O'Brien Award semifinalist. On November 1, Denard Robinson was named one of 10 finalists for the 2012 Johnny Unitas Golden Arm Award. On November 5, Brendan Gibbons was named a Lou Groza Award semifinalist. On November 13, Patrick Omameh was named a finalist for the 2012 Pop Warner National College Football Award. On November 27, Jordan Kovacs was named a finalist for the Burlsworth Trophy.

Lewan was named Big Ten Conference Offensive lineman of the Year, while Will Hagerup was the Conference Punter of the Year. Lewan and Omameh were named first team All-Big Ten by the coaches. Lewan and Hagerup were named first team by the media, while Craig Roh and Jordan Kovacs were second team by the coaches. Jake Ryan was named second team by the media. J. T. Floyd, Jeremy Gallon, Brendan Gibbons, Hagerup, Roy Roundtree, and Ryan were coaches honorable mention, while Will Campbell, Floyd, Devin Funchess, Gallon, Gibbons, Kovacs, Omameh, Robinson, Roh and Roundtree were honorable mention by the media. Lewan was a 2012 College Football All-America Team selection by the Associated Press (1st team), ESPN (1st team), Walter Camp Football Foundation (1st team),  Lindy's Sports (1st team), Sports Illustrated (1st team), CBSSports.com (2nd team), FoxSportsNext.com (Scout.com 2nd team), and Pro Football Weekly (honorable mention). CBSSports.com also named Lewan along with Hagerup to their All-Big Ten team. Kovacs earned team MVP for the season.
Lewan was named Big Ten Conference Offensive Lineman of the Year, while Will Hagerup was the Conference Punter of the Year. Lewan and Omameh were named first team All-Big Ten by the coaches. Lewan and Hagerup were named first team by the media, while Craig Roh and Jordan Kovacs were second team by the coaches. Jake Ryan was named second team by the media. J. T. Floyd, Jeremy Gallon, Brendan Gibbons, Hagerup, Roy Roundtree, and Ryan were coaches honorable mention, while Will Campbell, Floyd, Devin Funchess, Gallon, Gibbons, Kovacs, Omameh, Robinson, Roh and Roundtree were honorable mention by the media. Lewan was a 2012 College Football All-America Team selection by the Associated Press (1st team), ESPN (1st team), Walter Camp Football Foundation (1st team),  Lindy's Sports (1st team), Sports Illustrated (1st team), CBSSports.com (2nd team), FoxSportsNext.com (Scout.com 2nd team), and Pro Football Weekly (honorable mention). CBSSports.com also named Lewan along with Hagerup to their All-Big Ten team. Kovacs earned team MVP for the season.
60 Minutes aired a 13-minute college football segment hosted by Armen Keteyian on November 18 that featured Michigan football. Athletic director Dave Brandon, Brady Hoke, Denard Robinson and Jordan Kovacs were interviewed.  Only Brandon, Hoke and Robinson appeared in the on air segment and its online extra companion piece.

The following players were Academic All-Big Ten: Courtney Avery, Brennen Beyer, Seth Broekhuizen, Joey Burzynski, Jareth Glanda, Jeremy Jackson, Joe Kerridge, Jordan Kovacs, Mike Kwiatkowski, Desmond Morgan, Patrick Omameh, Joe Reynolds, Craig Roh, Matt Wile, Steve Wilson, and Charlie Zeller. Devin Funchess was a College Football News and FoxSportsNext Freshman All-America Second Team selection (behind Penn State's Kyle Carter). Robinson played in the 2013 Senior Bowl. Campbell and Roh were invited to the 2013 East–West Shrine Game.

Statistics
Michigan finished the regular season ranked eighth in the Big Ten in total offense and fifth in scoring offense.  Defensively, the team finished second in total defense in the Big Ten and 13th in the country, as well as second in the Big Ten in sacks allowed and fifth nationally in pass defense.

Denard Robinson finished third in the conference in rushing with an average of 115.09 yards per game. Dennis Norfleet finished second in the conference with an average of 28.21 yards per kick return. Desmond Morgan led the team in tackles with 7.36 per game, while Jake Ryan finished third in tackles-for-a-loss in the conference with an average of 1.23 tackles-for-a-loss per game.
The per game team rankings below include 120 Football Bowl Subdivision teams and 12 Big Ten Conference teams.

The per game rankings below include players who played in 75% of teams' games and were ranked in the top 100 national leaders and top 25 conference leaders:

Depth chart
Starters and backups against Alabama. Following Blake Countess's injury,  Courtney Avery replaced him atop the depth chart beginning in the second week of the season, while Ramon Taylor replaced Avery atop the depth chart beginning in the sixth week of the season. Fitzgerald Toussaint was injured in the win against Iowa and missed the rest of the season. Thomas Rawls replaced him at the top of the depth chart for the final two games of the season. Brandon Moore was injured during the first game of the season, but was not replaced atop the depth chart until Week 10 against Northwestern, which saw Mike Kwiatkowski become the starting tight end.

2013 NFL Draft

The 2013 NFL Draft ran from on April 25 to April 27. Michigan players eligible to be drafted were Denard Robinson, Jordan Kovacs, Roy Roundtree, Kenny Demens, Ricky Barnum, Elliott Mealer, Vincent Smith, Patrick Omameh, Mike Kwiatkowski, Brandon Moore, Brandin Hawthorne, J.T. Floyd, Will Campbell, Craig Roh, Steve Wilson, Jack Kennedy, Paul Gyarmati, Matthew Cavanaugh, and Floyd Simmons. Taylor Lewan decided to return for his senior season, despite being considered a potential first round pick in the draft. Denard Robinson was invited to the 2013 Senior Bowl as a wide receiver.

Robinson and Campbell were selected in the fifth and sixth rounds of the draft. Undrafted free agent signees were Kovacs (Dolphins), Roh (Panthers), Roundtree (Bengals), Mealer (Saints), Omameh (49ers), Demens (Texans) and Barnum (Redskins).

Roster

References

External links

Michigan
Michigan Wolverines football seasons
Michigan Wolverines football